Bustin' Out is the second studio album by American country rock band Pure Prairie League. Originally released by RCA Records in late 1972, the album garnered renewed interest almost 3 years after its release. By then, band leader Craig Fuller was no longer in the band due to draft board issues.

"Amie" was first released as a single in 1973 and failed to chart. In early 1975 it again began receiving airplay mostly on college radio stations and then on major U.S. radio stations. It hit #27 by May 1975. On the album, "Falling In and Out of Love" ends in a segue to "Amie", which then concludes with the main chorus of "Falling In and Out of Love." Because of this interrelationship, the pair of songs are sometimes played as a single track.

The album features a guest appearance by Mick Ronson who provided string arrangements on the track "Boulder Skies" and "Call Me, Tell Me."

Track listing
All songs written by Craig Fuller, except where noted.
"Jazzman" (Ed Holstein) – 2:34
"Angel #9" – 4:55
"Leave My Heart Alone" (George Powell) – 4:24
"Early Morning Riser" – 5:05
"Falling In and Out of Love" – 2:12
"Amie" – 4:18
"Boulder Skies" – 4:01
"Angel" – 4:26
"Call Me, Tell Me" – 2:41

Personnel
Pure Prairie League
Craig Fuller – bass guitar, electric guitar, vocals
George Ed Powell – electric guitar, vocals
William Frank Hinds – drums

Additional musicians
Michael Connor – piano, keyboards
James Rolleston – bass
Al Brisco – steel guitar
Mick Ronson – guitar, background vocals, string arrangements
Dianne Brooks – background vocals on "Leave My Heart Alone"
Little Bobby Ring[e] – marimba, shaker

Production
Producer: Robert Alan Ringe
Engineer: Mark Smith
Recording Technician: Cub Richardson
Digital Producer: Susan Ruskin
Digital Series Executive Producer: Don Wardell
Remastering: Rick Rowe
Art direction: Acy Lehman
Management: Roger Abramson

Charts
Album – Billboard (United States)

Singles - Billboard Hot 100

See also
Bustin' Out of L Seven

References

Pure Prairie League albums
1972 albums
RCA Records albums
Albums with cover art by Norman Rockwell